Oscar Ralph Whitbread  (26 November 1929 – 16 May 2016) was an English-Australian producer who worked extensively in television.

He moved to Australia in the late 1940s. Whitbread started his career at the ABC in 1956, where he served as the Head of Drama, before switching to the same position with the Seven Network. He was responsible for numerous successful series including Bellbird, The Flying Doctors and the miniseries Power Without Glory.
Whitbread was the senior executive producer at Crawford Productions and also worked in England for the BBC, Thames Television, Granada Television and London Weekend Television. During the 1970s, he worked as a lecturer in theatre media studies, at Charles Sturt University, Bathurst, New South Wales.

Personal life
Whitbread was married to Corinne Kerby. He died on 16 May 2016 after a long illness.

Select credits
Ice Circus (1963) (ice skating TV special)
Beauty and the Beast (1964) (ice skating TV special)
On Approval (1964) (TV movie) – producer
Corruption in the Palace of Justice (1964) (TV movie) – producer
The Winds of Green Monday (1965) (TV movie) – producer, director
Otherwise Engaged (1965) (TV movie) – producer
Duet on Wednesday (1965) (television play) – producer
Photo Finish (1965) (TV movie) – producer
Plain Jane (1966) (TV movie) – producer
Slow Poison (1967) (TV movie) – producer
Love and War (1967) (TV movie) – producer
The Shifting Heart (1968) (TV movie) – producer
Delta (Australian TV series) (1969) (TV series) – director
Dynasty (1969) (TV series) – director
Bellbird (1970–77) (TV series) – producer
A Family at War (1970) (TV series) – director
The Man Who Shot the Albatross (1972) (TV movie)
Frank and Francesca (1973) (TV series)
Marion (1974) (miniseries) – producer, director
And the Big Men Fly (1974) (TV series) – producer
Rush (1975) (TV series) – producer, director
The Professional Touch (1976) (television play)
Trial of Ned Kelly (1977) (TV movie)
Power Without Glory (1976) (mini series) – producer
Catspaw (1978) (TV series)
The Truckies (1978) (TV series)
Burn the Butterflies (1979) (TV movie)
A Wild Ass of a Man (1980) (TV movie)
Lucinda Brayford (1980) (mini series)
I Can Jump Puddles (1980)
Locusts and Wild Honey (1980) (TV series)
All the Green Year (1981) (mini series)
Outbreak of Love (1981) (mini series) – producer, director
The Young Wife (1984) (mini series) – producer, director
Golden Pennies (1985) (mini series) – producer, director
The Flying Doctors (1985) (mini series) – producer
The Flying Doctors (1986) (TV series) – producer, director
Studio 86 (1986) (TV series) – producer, director
Acropolis Now (1989) (TV series) – producer
The Power, The Passion (1989) (TV series) – producer
Ratbag Hero (1991) (mini series) – producer, director
Cluedo (1990–92) (TV series) – producer, director
Bush Patrol (1996) (TV series) – producer
The Balanced Particle Freeway (1997) (TV movie) – producer

References

External links

Oscar Whitbread at AustLit

1929 births
2016 deaths
Australian television producers
Australian film producers
English emigrants to Australia
Recipients of the Medal of the Order of Australia